This is a list of notable events in country music that took place in the year 1925.

Events 
 November 28 – Nashville radio station WSM begins a national institution with its first broadcast of the "WSM Barn Dance" – the weekly program that would go on to be known as the Grand Ole Opry.
 January 1925, the major labels were still releasing country material on pop labels. The record companies hadn't quite yet settled on the moniker of ‘hillbilly music’ for this new style of music. Descriptions included “Old- Time Tunes” (OKeh), “Old Familiar Tunes” (Columbia), “tunes from Dixie” (Brunswick), and “Olde Time Fiddlin’ Tunes from the Sunny South” (Victor). The term first appeared on an OKeh release from 1925, a recording of a string band from Watauga County, NC, who showed up at the New York recording studio without having decided what to call themselves. When Ralph Peer, who was supervising the sessions, asked for their names, one of the group's members responded, “We’re nothing but a bunch of hillbillies from North Carolina and Virginia. Call us anything.” So Peer released the sides under the name “the Hill Billies.”
 Aug 1924 thru March 1926 to 1930 "The Prisoner's Song" by Vernon Dalhart becomes country music's first-ever million-seller, and has two waves of popularity — during the early summer months and again at the end of the year. The song goes on to sell 7 million copies. On March 18, 1926, Dalhart re-cut electronic versions of both sides of Victor 19427, which were released with the same disc number, and are included in the sales figures. 1924 Prisoner's Song was take 2, and 1926 version was take 6; The Wreck of the Old 97 take 1 1924, and 1926 was take 4.

No dates
 Radio station WSM signs on the air, and is credited for helping spread the popularity of the fledgling country music genre.
 Beginning of "Old Familiar Melodies" series on Columbia Records.
 Bradley Kincaid joins the cast of WLS Barn Dance.

Top Hillbilly (Country) Recordings

The following songs were extracted from records included in Joel Whitburn's Pop Memories 1890-1954, record sales reported on the "Discography of American Historical Recordings" website, and other sources as specified. Numerical rankings are approximate, they are only used as a frame of reference.

Births 
 May 23 – Mac Wiseman, leading bluegrass artist from the 1940s onward (died 2019).
 August 7 – Felice Bryant, songwriter (with husband Boudleaux) of many 1950s and 1960s hits (died 2003).
 August 15 – Rose Maddox, fiddle player, leader of the Maddox Brothers and Rose, and early innovator of rockabilly (died 1998).
 August 28 – Billy Grammer, Grand Ole Opry member best known for his hit "Gotta Travel On" (died 2011).
 September 3 – Hank Thompson, singer who fused western swing and honky tonk for a series of successful records from the 1940s through 1970s (died 2007).
 September 26 – Marty Robbins, multi-genre singer-songwriter and television host (died 1982).
 December 3 – Ferlin Husky, honky-tonk styled singer of the 1950s through early 1970s, best known for "Gone" and "Wings of a Dove," and hits under his comic alias "Simon Crum" ("Country Music is Here to Stay") (died 2011).

Further reading 
 Kingsbury, Paul, "Vinyl Hayride: Country Music Album Covers 1947–1989," Country Music Foundation, 2003
 Millard, Bob, "Country Music: 70 Years of America's Favorite Music," HarperCollins, New York, 1993
 Whitburn, Joel. "Joel Whitburn's Pop Memories 1890–1954: The History of American Popular Music", Record Research Inc., Menomonee Falls, Wisconsin, 1986.

References

Country
Country music by year